"Real Rock" is an instrumental reggae song by the Jamaican band Sound Dimension. It was recorded in 1967 at Jamaica Recording Studio in Kingston, Jamaica, and released as a single in 1968 by Studio One. The song was produced by Clement "Coxsone" Dodd and performed by Eric Frater (guitar), Boris Gardiner (bass guitar), Phil Callender (drums), Denzel Laing (percussion), Vin Gordon (trombone) and Jackie Mittoo (keyboards), who played the riddim's signature three-note Hammond organ figure.

The song is significant for giving rise to perhaps the most popular reggae riddim of all time, having been versioned hundreds of times by artists including The Clash, KRS-One and 311. According to a 2004 The New York Times article, C. Dodd considered the song his crowning achievement.

Partial list of songs using the "Real Rock" riddim
 "Real Rock", Sound Dimension (1967)
 "Rockers' Rock", Augustus Pablo (1973)
 "Cool Out Son", Junior Murvin (1978)
 "Friday Evening", Joe Tex & U Black (1978)
 "Stop The Fussing & Fighting", Dennis Brown (1978)
 "Cool Out Son", Junior Murvin (1979)
 "Nice Up The Dance", Michigan & Smiley (1979)
 "Armagideon Time", Willi Williams (1977) / The Clash (1979)
 “Pie In The Sky”, Scientist (1982)
 "Lend Me Your Chopper" / "Lend Me the 16", Johnny Osbourne (1983)
 "Eni Meeni Mini Mo", Tenor Saw (1985)
 "Dem A Go Feel It", Frankie Paul (1985)
 "The Real Rock", Shinehead (1990)
 "If I Ever Fall In Love Again", Sanchez (1993)
 "Black Cop", KRS-One (1993)
 "Un Spectacle De Plus", Billy Ze Kick (1993)
 “Roots Reality and Culture”, Bounty Killer (1994)
 "All Mixed Up", 311 (1995)
 "Too Greedy", Super Cat (1995)
 "Original", Raggasonic (1998)
 A hidden track at the end of Seeed's New Dubby Conquerors album (2001)
 "Keep In Touch", Sizzla (2003)
 "She Loves Me Now", Cocoa Tea (1999) (Sundance 2008)

Track listing

References

External links 
 
 Real Rock Riddim at Frenkieh.com Riddim Database

1967 songs
1968 singles
Reggae songs
Riddims
Songs written by Coxsone Dodd